Tiner is a surname. Notable people with the surname include:

Hugh M. Tiner (1908–1981), American academic administrator
John Tiner (born 1957), British businessman

See also
Tinel